The Aberdonian was a named passenger train operating in the United Kingdom.

History
On 1 January 1927 the London and North Eastern Railway decided to officially adopt the name Aberdonian for its sleeping car express between King's Cross and Aberdeen It was timed to depart King's Cross at 7:40pm with a journey time to Aberdeen of a little over 11 hours, originally being hauled by Class C11 locomotives.

By 1939 the train was departing King's Cross at 7:30pm. A restaurant car was provided as far as York. At Edinburgh, sections of train were disconnected to form services to Fort William and Mallaig, and Perth and Inverness. The Aberdeen section of the train called at Dundee, Arbroath, Montrose and Stonehaven, arriving in Aberdeen at 7:30am, a journey time of exactly 12 hours. The return journey left Aberdeen at 7:35pm, and arrived in King's Cross 11 hours 50 minutes later, with journey times shortened by streamlined P2 and A4 engines.

The Aberdonian continued during the Second World War with extended journey times and afterwards Peppercorn A1 locomotives, but noticeable improvements were only achieved with the introduction of Deltic locomotives, which reduced the journey time to 11 hours 10 minutes.

On 7 January 1957 the Aberdonian ran into the back of a local train one mile south of Welwyn Garden City railway station. The accident killed 3 people and injured 26.

All eleven coaches were derailed.

In 1971, British Rail withdrew the name Aberdonian from the early evening departure from King's Cross, then timed at 7:55pm. The name Night Aberdonian was then used on the 10.15 King's Cross to Aberdeen sleeper service. This also crashed at Morpeth, in 1984.

External links 
Link to details of the 1957 Aberdonian accident at The Railways Archive
Official report into the 1969 Aberdonian accident at The Railways Archive

References

Named passenger trains of the London and North Eastern Railway
Named passenger trains of British Rail
Rail transport in Scotland
Railway services introduced in 1927
1927 establishments in England